Lebia collaris is a species of  beetle in the family Carabidae. It is found in the United States.

References

Further reading

 
 
 
 

Lebia
Beetles described in 1826
Endemic fauna of the United States
Taxa named by Pierre François Marie Auguste Dejean